Habronattus carolinensis is a species of jumping spider in the family Salticidae. It is found in the United States and Canada?.

References

Further reading

External links

 

Salticidae
Articles created by Qbugbot
Spiders described in 1901